The discography of the experimental music group Psychic TV consists of over 100 full-length albums, over 15 compilation albums and over 30 singles and EPs.

Studio albums

Force the Hand of Chance (LP, cassette) (1982)
Themes (LP) (1982)
Dreams Less Sweet (LP, cassette) (1983)
Pagan Day (LP, 12" picture disc) (1984)
Those Who Do Not (2x12") (1984)
Descending (1984)
Mouth of the Night (CD, LP, 12" picture disc) (1985)
Themes 2 (LP) (1985)
Themes 3 (LP) (1986)
The Magickal Mystery D Tour EP (1986)
Allegory and Self (CD, LP, 12" picture disc) (1988)
Jack the Tab – Acid Tablets Volume One (CD, LP, 12" picture disc) (1988)
Tekno Acid Beat (CD, LP) (1988)
Kondole (CD) (1989)
At Stockholm (CD) (1990)
Jack the Tab/Tekno Acid Beat (2xCD, 2X12") (1990)
Towards Thee Infinite Beat (CD, 12", cassette) (1990)
Beyond Thee Infinite Beat (CD, 2x12", cassette) (1990)
Direction ov Travel (CD) (1991)
Ultrahouse The L.A. Connection (CD) (1991)
Cold Dark Matter (CD) (1992)
Peak Hour (album) (1993)
A Hollow Cost (CD) (1994)
AL – OR – AL (CD) (1994)
Electric Newspaper Issue One (CD) (1994)
Cathedral Engine (CD) (1994)
Sugarmorphoses (CD) (1994)
Ultradrug (CD) (1994)
Sirens (Ultradrug – Thee Sequel) (CD) (1995)
Electric Newspaper Issue Two (CD) (1995)
Breathe (CD) (1995)
Electric Newspaper Issue Three (CD) (1995)
Trip Reset (CD) (1996)
Cold Blue Torch (1996)
 Column One & Psychic TV – E-Lusive (1997)
Hell Is Invisible... Heaven Is Her/e (CD) (2007)
Mr. Alien Brain vs. the Skinwalkers (2008)
Snakes (2014)
Alienist (CD) (2016)

EPs 
Psychic TV/PTV3 – Alien Brain Vs Maggot Brain (12" Vinyl only) (Vanity Case Records 2010)
Psychic TV/PTV3 – Mother Sky Vs Alien Sky (12" Vinyl only) (2011)
Psychic TV/PTV3 – Thank you (12" Vinyl only) (2011)
Psychic TV/PTV3 – Silver Sundown Machine Vs. Alien Lightning Meat Machine (12" Vinyl only) (2012)
Psychic TV/PTV3 – Greyhounds Of The Future / Alien Lightning Meat Machine (12" Vinyl only) (2013)

Singles
"Just Drifting" (1982)
"The Full Pack" (1983)
"Unclean" (7", 12") (1984)
"Roman P" (1984)
"Godstar" (1985)
"Good Vibrations"
"Magick Defends Itself" (1986)
"Joy" (1988)
"Tune In (Turn On the Acid House)" (1988)
"Je T'Aime" (7", 12") (1989)
"Love War Riot" (1989)
"High Jack" (1990)
"I.C. Water" (1990)
"Ultrahouse the Twelve Inch Mixes" (1991)
"Re-Mind" (1993)
"Tribal" (1994)
 Column One & Psychic TV – E-Lusive (1997)
"Snowflake/Illusive" (2002)

Compilation albums 

Splinter Test 1 (3 x CD + box set) (1993)
Splinter Test 2 (3 x CD + box set) (1993)
Hex Sex: The Singles Part 1 (CD) (1994)
Beauty From Thee Beast – Thee Best ov Psychic TV and Genesis P-Orridge (CD) (1995)
Godstar: The Singles – Pt. 2 (CD) (1995)
Origin of the Species: A Supply of Two Tablets of Acid (2 x CD) (1998)
Best Ov: Time's Up (CD) (1999)
"Origin of the Species" Volume Too!: A Second Supply of Two Tablets of Acid (2 x CD) (1999)
"Origin of the Species" Volume III: The Final Supply of Two Tablets of Acid (2 x CD) (2002)
Godstar: Thee Director's Cut (2 x CD) (2004)
Fishscales Falling: A Smogasbord ov Delights – Mixtape Volume 1 (digital) (2016) – iTunes exclusive

Live releases 

At the Edge (2 x cassette)
Finsbury Park (cassette)
Hackney Empire (cassette)
Hamburg 16;9;84 (cassette)
Hammersmith Palais 19:5:85 (cassette)
Berlin Atonal Vol. 1 (LP) (1984)
Berlin Atonal Vol. 2 (LP) (1984)
N.Y. Scum (LP) (1984)
Descending (CD) (1985)
Live in Paris (LP) (1986)
Live in Tokyo (LP) (1986)
Live at Final Wars (LP) (1986)
Live en Suisse (LP) (1987)
Live in Glasgow (LP) (1987)
Live in Gottingen (LP) (1987)
Live in Heaven (LP) (1987)
Live in Reykjavik (LP) (1987)
Live in Toronto (LP) (1987)
Temporary Temple (LP) (1987)
Album 10 (LP) Picture LP. Limited Edition of 1000 numbered copies only (1988)
Live at the 930 Club Washington, D.C. (Cassette) (1988)
Live at Thee Circus (LP) (1988)
Live at Thee Mardi Gras (LP) (1988)
A Real Swedish Live Show (1989)
Live at Thee Pyramid (LP, LP picture disc) (1989)
Live at Thee Ritz (LP) (1989)
Live at the Berlin Wall Part One (CD) (1990)
Live at the Berlin Wall Part Two (CD) (1990)
Live in Bregenz (CD, LP) (1990)
Temporary Temple & Atonal (CD) (1993)
Mein-Goett-In-Gen (CD) (1994)
Live in Berlin I (CD) (2003) – reissue of Live at the Berlin Wall Part One
Live in Berlin II (CD) (2003) – reissue of Live at the Berlin Wall Part Two
Live in Thee East Village (CD) (2003) – reissue of Blinded Eye in Thee Pyramid
Live in Europa I (CD) (2003) – official release of the bootleg Rare and Alive
Black
Live in Thee Mean Fiddler (CD) (2003)
Live in Astoria (CD) (2003) – reissue of Live at Thee Circus
Live in Glasgow Plus (CD) (2003)
Live in Russia (CD) (2006)

Other releases

Two Interviews (cassette)
Interviews (2 x cassette)
 (untitled interview cassette)
Temple ov Psychick Youth (cassette)
Listen Today (CD, video) (1987)
 Psychic TV / PTV3 USB (USB stick)

Various artist compilation appearances
 "Boys Are Girls and Girls Are Boys" on Silver Monk Time – A Tribute to the Monks (2006)
 "Only Love Can Break Your Heart" on The Bridge – A Tribute to Neil Young (1989)

Video releases

Hyperdelia (VHS) (1986)
8Transmissions8 (1987)
Joy (VHS) (1989)
Black (VHS) (1991)
Maple Syrup (VHS) (1991)
Beauty From Thee Beast (VHS) (1995)
Time's Up Live (DVD) (2001)
Black Joy (DVD)
Psychic TV Live at the Coral Room (DVD) (2004)

Bootlegs and unofficial
Ov Power (1984)
Southern Comfort
Live Transmission (1984)

References

External links 

 Retrieved 21 July 2018.

Discographies of British artists
Rock music group discographies